Sphingomonas gei  is a Gram-negative, strictly aerobic and motile bacteria from the genus of Sphingomonas with a single polar flagellum which has been isolated from roots of the plant Geum aleppicum from the Mount Taibai in the Shaanxi Province in China.

References

Further reading 
 

gei
Bacteria described in 2015
Gram-negative bacteria